Ambrose Ransom "Rans" Wright (April 26, 1826 – December 21, 1872) was a lawyer, Georgia politician, and Confederate general in the American Civil War.

Early life
Wright, known by the nickname "Rans", was born in Louisville, Georgia. He read law under the tutelage of Governor and Senator Herschel V. Johnson, who later became his brother-in-law, and was admitted to the bar. He became prominent politically, although he ran unsuccessfully for the Georgia legislature and for the United States Congress. He was a presidential elector for Millard Fillmore in 1856, a supporter of Bell and Everett in 1860, and a Georgia commissioner to Maryland in 1861.

Civil War
At the start of the Civil War, Wright enlisted as a private in Georgia Militia, but he was commissioned colonel of the 3rd Georgia Infantry on May 18, 1861, and served in North Carolina and Georgia until the summer of 1862 and won a victory for the Confederacy at the Battle of South Mills in North Carolina in April 1862. In May, Wright traveled with his regiment to Virginia and fought in the Battle of Seven Pines as part of Brig. Gen Albert G. Blanchard's brigade. Blanchard was removed from command afterwards due to poor performance and Wright replaced him, being promoted to brigadier general.

Wright's Georgians made a distinguished record in the Army of Northern Virginia from the Seven Days Battles to the Siege of Petersburg. He was badly wounded at the Battle of Antietam in 1862 and at Chancellorsville in 1863.

At the Battle of Gettysburg, Wright's brigade, part of Maj. Gen. Richard H. Anderson's division of Lt. Gen. A.P. Hill's Corps, breached the Union defenses on Cemetery Ridge on July 2, 1863. His command drove off the Union force and captured twenty artillery pieces, before being forced to retire through lack of support.

Wright continued to lead his brigade as part of Anderson's division in A.P. Hill's Third Corps in subsequent the Bristoe and Mine Run Campaigns of 1863, as well as the Overland Campaign of 1864.

As of November 26, 1864, Wright was named major general on a temporary commission (which was not made permanent) and ordered to Georgia, where he exercised command until the end of the war.

Postbellum career
In 1863, Wright had been elected to the Georgia State Senate and president of that body in absentia. Resuming his law practice after the termination of hostilities, he purchased the Augusta Chronicle & Sentinel newspaper in 1866, and, in 1871, was defeated for the Democratic nomination for the United States Senate. The following year, General Wright was a delegate to both the state and national Democratic conventions and was elected to the United States House of Representatives, but died at Augusta, Georgia, before taking his seat. At a special election to fill the vacancy, Alexander Stephens was elected his successor. General Wright is buried in Magnolia Cemetery (formerly City Cemetery), Augusta.

His grandson was U.S. Senator John S. Cohen.

See also

List of American Civil War generals (Confederate)
List of members-elect of the United States House of Representatives who never took their seats

References

 Eicher, John H., and David J. Eicher, Civil War High Commands. Stanford: Stanford University Press, 2001. .
 Sifakis, Stewart. Who Was Who in the Civil War. New York: Facts On File, 1988. .
 Warner, Ezra J. Generals in Gray: Lives of the Confederate Commanders. Baton Rouge: Louisiana State University Press, 1959. .

|-

1826 births
1872 deaths
19th-century American politicians
19th-century American lawyers
American lawyers admitted to the practice of law by reading law
Confederate States Army brigadier generals
Editors of Georgia (U.S. state) newspapers
Elected officials who died without taking their seats
Georgia (U.S. state) lawyers
Georgia (U.S. state) state senators
People from Louisville, Georgia
People of Georgia (U.S. state) in the American Civil War